The Welterweight class in the boxing at the 1996 Summer Olympics competition was the fifth-heavyest class at the 1996 Summer Olympics in Atlanta, Georgia. The weight class was open for boxers weighing more than 67 kilograms. The competition in the Alexander Memorial Coliseum started on 1996-07-20 and ended on 1996-08-04.

Medalists

Results

References

Boxing at the 1996 Summer Olympics